The Transmission Gully Motorway is a , four-lane motorway north of Wellington, New Zealand; it is part of the State Highway 1 route. Construction began on 8 September 2014 and completion was originally scheduled for April 2020, but contractual negotiations as well as difficulties resulting from the COVID-19 pandemic caused delays. The motorway was officially opened on 30 March 2022 and opened to public traffic the following day.

Route

A highway connecting the Kapiti Coast to Pāuatahanui through the Wainui Saddle was first proposed in 1919 by William Hughes Field, the MP for Ōtaki at the time, as one of two alternatives to the steep, narrow and windy Paekakariki Hill Road between Paekākāriki and Pāuatahanui. His alternative proposal would become the main route north of Wellington from Ngauranga to Paekākāriki through Pukerua Bay, known as the Centennial Highway. This route began construction in 1936 and opened on 4 November 1939, with the section north from Pukerua Bay running along a narrow strip of coastline below the Paekakariki escarpment.  Despite this, in the succeeding years public interest remained and consideration was still given to constructing the route through the Wainui Saddle as Field had envisaged, until construction of the Transmission Gully route eventually commenced in November 2014.

The Transmission Gully route complements the previous Centennial Highway route (now State Highway 59) along the coast, and provides a new route between the Kapiti Coast and Wellington. From its northern terminus at Mackays Crossing, the route proceeds a short distance to an interchange providing access to Paekākāriki and Pukerua Bay before rising steeply inland to the Wainui Saddle, and then gently descends through Transmission Gully following the Horokiri Stream to Pāuatahanui, where an interchange with State Highway 58 provides access to and from the Hutt Valley. A subsequent interchange links to a local road, again constructed along with the motorway, that provides access to the Porirua City Centre, before the motorway terminates at Linden on the boundary of Porirua and Wellington City, where it merges on to the older Johnsonville–Porirua Motorway.

The Transmission Gully route was formally declared a motorway on 16 August 2021 with the declaration coming into force 28 days later.

Construction

Although first proposed in 1919, it was only late in the first decade of the 21st century that serious steps were taken towards construction. The Greater Wellington Regional Council, in preparing its Western Corridor Plan, initially rejected Transmission Gully as unaffordable, preferring to upgrade the existing coastal route, but changed its position after public consultation.

On 15 December 2009 Minister of Transport Steven Joyce announced the Government's commitment to the project as one of seven Roads of National Significance, with a predicted project cost of NZ$1.025 billion.

On 15 August 2011, the New Zealand Transport Agency (NZTA), Porirua City Council, and Transpower jointly applied to the Environmental Protection Authority (New Zealand) (EPA) for notices of requirement and resource consents for the Transmission Gully Proposal.

On 4 May 2012, after a series of public hearings, the EPA-appointed board of inquiry into the Transmission Gully proposal stated in a draft decision that it would grant resource consents for the project.

On 22 June 2012, the Environmental Protection Authority released the Transmission Gully Board of Inquiry's final report. The Board of Inquiry approved the resource consents and the notices of requirement required for the Transmission Gully Proposal.

On 16 May 2013, national grid owner Transpower applied for consent to the Kapiti Coast District Council to rebuild its Valley Road, Paraparaumu substation to 220 kV and build two short transmission lines to connect it to the two Bunnythorpe to Haywards 220 kV lines to the east. This would allow Transpower to demolish the existing 110 kV line between Pāuatahanui and Paraparaumu through Transmission Gully, rather than having to relocate it around the motorway.

In spite of significant opposition, construction of the four-lane motorway began on 8 September 2014 with completion originally scheduled for April 2020. Delays due to contractual disputes and difficulties caused by the COVID-19 pandemic pushed the budget out and the opening was scheduled for late 2021. In mid-December 2021, it was announced that the road would not be open by Christmas.

Opening

On 30 March 2022, Prime Minister Jacinda Ardern officially opened the motorway. The road was officially gifted the name Te Ara Nui o Te Rangihaeata / Great Path of Te Rangihaeata by the Ngati Toa tribe in honour of Te Rangihaeata, a chief who played a leading role in the Wairau Affray and the Hutt Valley Campaign in the New Zealand Wars.  The motorway passes to the side of the location of the Battle of Battle Hill, where the final stand-off between Te Rangihaeata and forces loyal to the British Empire took place before Te Rangihaeata retreated to Poroutawhao in the Horowhenua District.

The motorway opened to motorists on the morning of 31 March 2022. On opening day, a Holden VF Commodore police car drove into the northbound truck arrester bed due to driver error. It was repaired and continued in service until it reached the end of its service life in May that year. After being retired the car was preserved at the Southward Car Museum.

Controversy

Developing a Transmission Gully road has been a topic of considerable debate in Wellington politics for some time, even as far back as 1919.

Supporters claimed that it will improve access to Wellington City, arguing that the existing coastal route is too congested, is accident-prone, and could be damaged in a serious earthquake. Peter Dunne, former MP for Ohariu, says that "[i]mproving Wellington City's northern access and egress is a vital key to the future economic performance and prosperity of the whole region, and the Transmission Gully highway is a vital link in that chain".

Opponents of Transmission Gully stated that there were better ways to improve access to Wellington. The highway would require an extremely steep gradient on its northernmost end and many opponents consider that it would thus not actually offer any improvement over the existing coastal highway. The route that the highway must take is along the major fault line of the region, which would make it at least as earthquake prone as the existing coastal highway.

Some suggested that the existing coastal route should be upgraded, rather than building a completely new route. This was the original recommendation of the Regional Council, and was put forward as the primary alternative to building Transmission Gully. Public submissions to the Council were in favour of Transmission Gully, and the Council has changed its stance in response.

Opponents of upgrading the coastal route said that doing so would cause significant disruption to the communities it passes through, whereas Transmission Gully avoids urban areas. The former Mayor of Porirua, Jenny Brash, has said that an upgrade would generate large numbers of complaints from Porirua residents, and would therefore have difficulty receiving resource consent. 
Others, such as the Green Party and the lobby group Option 3, believed that the money would be better spent on improving Wellington's public transport, particularly the existing rail line. They argued that the original choice between building Transmission Gully or upgrading the coastal route was a false dichotomy, and that in reality neither option was necessary or desirable.

Cost
Some opponents of the Transmission Gully project believed that its overall cost is too high, and that the region has insufficient funds to spend on it, with a benefit/cost ratio of 0.6. The previous Mayor of Wellington, Kerry Prendergast, has described the project as "unaffordable". It has been suggested that making Transmission Gully a toll road would help resolve this problem and tolls would only cover a fraction of the funds necessary to build the highway.

In May 2012, Julie Anne Genter, the Greens' spokeswoman on transport, described the motorway as incurring costs of $1 billion when the official business case benefits were $600 million, in order to ease congestion for an unlikely projected growth of 1500 vehicles per day. In February 2020 it was announced that the expected cost of $850m had been increased by another $191m. In March 2021 the road was reported to cost a projected $1.25 billion by its then-expected opening date in September 2021, and will not include a planned extra merge lane at the Linden interchange to relieve congestion.

Technical and environmental issues
There have been claims that the route of Transmission Gully is problematic due to steep gradients, environmental damage and earthquake hazards. The route passes near the Pāuatahanui Inlet, an environmentally sensitive wetland area, and construction has been identified as the likely cause of increased sedimentation.

Name in official records
Land information New Zealand (LINZ) has applied the name gifted by Ngāti Toa Rangatira to the NZ Topo 50 map BP31.   Neither of the names Te Ara Nui o Rangihaeata or Transmission Gully appear in the NZ Gazetteer

Interchanges

See also
List of motorways and expressways in New Zealand

References

External links
 NZTA Transmission Gully Project
 Wellington Regional Council's adopted Western Corridor Plan (PDF)
 Option 3, a pressure group opposed to the Transmission Gully Motorway

Motorways in New Zealand
Proposed roads in New Zealand
Transport in Wellington
Porirua